962 Aslög is a minor planet orbiting the Sun that was discovered by German astronomer Karl Wilhelm Reinmuth on 25 October 1921. Measurements of the lightcurve made in 2010 and 2011 give a rotation period of 5.465 ± 0.01 hours.

This is a member of the dynamic Koronis family of asteroids that most likely formed as the result of a collisional breakup of a parent body.

References

External links 
 
 

000962
Discoveries by Karl Wilhelm Reinmuth
Named minor planets
000962
19211025